The Vines may refer to:

 The Vines, Oxford, a historic house in Oxford, England
 The Vines, Western Australia, a golf course and residential estate in Western Australia
 The Vines (band), an Australian alternative rock band

See also
Vine (disambiguation)
Grapevine (disambiguation)
Vine Street (disambiguation)
Vine (surname)
Vines (surname)